Tonbridge and Malling Borough Council is the local authority for the borough of Tonbridge and Malling in Kent, United Kingdom. The council is elected every four years. Since the last boundary changes in 2003, 53 councillors have been elected from 26 wards.

Political control
The first election to the council was held in 1973, initially operating as a shadow authority before coming into its powers on 1 April 1974. Political control of the council since 1973 has been held by the following parties:

Leadership
The leaders of the council since 1973 have been:

Council elections
1973 Tonbridge and Malling District Council election
1976 Tonbridge and Malling District Council election
1979 Tonbridge and Malling District Council election (New ward boundaries)
1980 Tonbridge and Malling District Council election
1982 Tonbridge and Malling District Council election
1983 Tonbridge and Malling District Council election
1984 Tonbridge and Malling Borough Council election
1986 Tonbridge and Malling Borough Council election
1987 Tonbridge and Malling Borough Council election
1988 Tonbridge and Malling Borough Council election
1991 Tonbridge and Malling Borough Council election (New ward boundaries)
1995 Tonbridge and Malling Borough Council election
1999 Tonbridge and Malling Borough Council election
2003 Tonbridge and Malling Borough Council election (New ward boundaries reduced the number of seats by 2)
2007 Tonbridge and Malling Borough Council election
2011 Tonbridge and Malling Borough Council election
2015 Tonbridge and Malling Borough Council election (New ward boundaries)
2019 Tonbridge and Malling Borough Council election

The elections scheduled to take place in 1990 were cancelled due to the council's decision to move to all-out elections in 1991 on new boundaries.

By-election results

1995–99
A by-election was held in East Peckham Ward following the resignation of E. Pries.

A by-election was held in Cage Green Ward following the resignation of G. Evans.

1999–03

2003–07
A by-election was held in Burham, Wouldham & Eccles Ward following the resignation of John Jennings on 23 August 2004.

A by-election was held in Ightham Ward following the death of Geraldine Bowden.

2007–11
There were no by-elections between May 2007 and May 2011.

2011–15
A by-election was held in West Malling and Leybourne Ward following the death of Mark Worrall on 26 April 2012.

A by-election was held in Borough Green and Long Mill Ward following the resignation of David Evans in December 2013.

2015-2019

2019-2023

References

External links
Tonbridge and Malling Borough Council

 
Tonbridge and Malling
Tonbridge and Malling